Asty is an ancient Greek term for a city; most often used for the city of Athens, as opposed to the rest of Attica. 

The name can also refer to:

 To Asty, Greek newspaper published in Athens
 Asty Tokushima, conference venue in Tokushima, Japan
 John Asty (c. 1672 – 1730), English clergyman